R325 road may refer to:
 R325 road (Ireland)
 R325 road (South Africa)